Cristoforo Greppi (Active early 17th century) was an Italian painter of the Mannerist period, active in Rome.

He was born in Como, Region of Lombardy, in Italy. He worked circa 1600 with Prospero Orsi and Francesco Nappi under the guidance of Cristoforo Roncalli in the decoration of the Palazzo Mattei, Rome. Greppi painted the fresco of Joseph's brothers in Egypt. In 1605–1608, he worked with the same team in decoration for Vatican palaces.  Greppi also worked with Giovanni Battista Ricci in the decoration of the Castellani chapel in San Francesco a Ripa, Rome. He also worked in painting the vault of the Albertoni Chapel in the same church.

References

Year of birth unknown
Year of death unknown
16th-century Italian painters
Italian male painters
17th-century Italian painters
Mannerist painters